Pachycarus is a genus of beetles in the family Carabidae, containing the following species:

 Pachycarus aculeatus Reiche & Saulcy, 1855
 Pachycarus artipunctatus (Dvorak, 1993)
 Pachycarus atrocoeruleus (Waltl, 1838)
 Pachycarus brevipennis Chaudoir, 1850
 Pachycarus cyaneus (Dejean, 1830)
 Pachycarus latreillei Solier, 1835
 Pachycarus macedonicus V. & B. Gueorguiev, 1997

References

Harpalinae